The India national cricket team toured the West Indies from April to June 2002 to play 5 Test matches and 5 Limited Overs Internationals.

Squads

Test series summary
 1st Test at Bourda, Georgetown – match drawn.
 2nd Test at Queen's Park Oval, Port of Spain, Trinidad – India won by 37 runs.
 3rd Test at Kensington Oval, Bridgetown, Barbados – West Indies won by 10 wickets.
 4th Test at Antigua Recreation Ground, St John's – match drawn.
 5th Test at Sabina Park, Kingston – West Indies won by 155 runs.

1st Test

2nd Test

3rd Test

4th Test

 VVS Laxman, Rahul Dravid and Wasim Jaffer takes their maiden test wicket.

5th Test

One Day Internationals (ODIs)

1st ODI

2nd ODI

3rd ODI

4th ODI

5th ODI

References

2002 in West Indian cricket
2002
International cricket competitions in 2002
2001–02 West Indian cricket season
2002 in Indian cricket